The March of the Iron Will was an Italian Fascist propaganda event staged from 26 April to 5 May 1936, during the final days of the Second Italo-Ethiopian War. Its goal  was to capture the Ethiopian capital, Addis Ababa in a show of force. An Italian mechanized column under the command of Pietro Badoglio, Marshal of Italy, advanced from the town of Dessie to take Addis Ababa.

Background 
During the 3rd of October 1935, elements of the Royal Italian Army (Regio Esercito) under General Emilio De Bono (the Commander-in-Chief of all Italian armed forces in East Africa) invaded the Ethiopian Empire from staging areas in the Italian colony of Eritrea on what was known as the "northern front." Forces based in Italian Somaliland under General Rodolfo Graziani invaded Ethiopia on what was known as the "southern front." Ground forces on both fronts were amply supported by the Italian Royal Air Force (Regia Aeronautica).

Badoglio replaced De Bono in late 1935 and was immediately faced with the Ethiopian "Christmas Offensive." On 26 December, Badoglio asked for and was given permission to use mustard gas and phosgene. The Italians delivered the poison gas by special artillery canisters and with bombers of the Italian Royal Air Force. While the poorly equipped Ethiopians experienced some success against the more modern weaponry of the Italians, they were not equipped to handle, or experience in dealing with the "terrible rain that burned and killed."

From early 1936, events on the field of battle did not go well for the Imperial Ethiopian Army. On the southern front, Graziani eliminated a large Ethiopian army commanded by Duke (Ras) Desta Damtew during the Battle of Ganale Doria using poison gas.  Badoglio used poison gas to eliminate many of the Ethiopian northern armies. He destroyed Ras Mulugeta Yeggazu's army in the Battle of Amba Aradam. He destroyed Ras Kassa Haile Darge's army in the Second Battle of Tembien. Finally, he destroyed Ras Imru Haile Sellassie's army in the Battle of Shire.

By 31 March, the last Ethiopian army on the northern front was commanded in battle by the Emperor himself, Haile Selassie.  His army included six battalions of Ethiopia's best troops, the Imperial Guard (Kebur Zabangna).  The Emperor led an ill-fated counterattack during the Battle of Maychew of which he had little to no chance of victory. The Emperor's army suffered heavy losses during costly frontal assaults on prepared Italian fortifications, but the bulk of his army was destroyed during the days following the battle, when poison gas was again used to decimate the withdrawing columns.

On 20 April, Marshal Badoglio flew to the town of Dessie in Wollo Province and made his headquarters there. He decided to advance from Dessie and take the Ethiopian capital of Addis Ababa.  Dessie is only two-hundred miles (320 km) from Addis Ababa.  Except for a procession of refugees, the road to the capital was clear.  The Italian Commander-in-Chief faced no substantial Ethiopian resistance.

Mechanized column 
Because of the lack of resistance between Dessie and Addis Ababa, Badoglio risked a spectacular advance with a "mechanized column" for propaganda purposes. In 1936, "mechanized" meant infantry transported in a variety of commercial cars and trucks.  "Motorized infantry" is a more appropriate term for Badoglio's column.

Thanks to the organizational genius of a Quartermaster-General Fidenzio Dall'Ora, Badoglio's "mechanized column" came together in Dessie between 21 and 25 April. Dall'Ora was able to organize the most powerful "mechanized" column to appear on an African road up to that time. In addition to 12,500 Italian troops, the column included 1,785 cars and trucks of all makes (Fiats, Lancias, Alfa-Romeos, Fords, Chevrolets, Bedfords, and Studebakers), a squadron of light tanks (L3s), eleven batteries of artillery, and aircraft.  Special vehicles carried 193 horses so that when the column arrived at the gates of Addis Ababa, the Marshal and his staff could leave their cars and ride in triumph on horseback.

March 

On 24 April, Badoglio sent two columns of 4,000 Eritreans ahead by force march to protect his mechanized force as a precautionary measure. But the adversity the Eritreans and the march itself encountered was mainly caused by rain and mud.  Badoglio's precautionary measure proved to be superfluous.

Imperial highway
Badoglio's mechanized force advanced along the Imperial Highway between Dessie and Addis Ababa. The Italian Commander-in-Chief was to uncharitably refer to this road as "a bad cart track".

Badoglio expected some show of resistance at Termaber Pass, and the mechanized column did halt there for two days but all was quiet. The column stopped because a section of the road had been demolished and had to be repaired. On 4 May the Italian formation was ambushed in Chacha, near Debre Berhan, by Ethiopian forces under Haile Mariam Mammo. In the ensuing battle,
Haile Mariam's men killed approximately 170 Italian colonial troops and captured four Italians, two of whom were doctors. They were later released.

Addis Ababa
In Addis Ababa, Emperor Haile Selassie visited the French Legation. After explaining to French Minister Paul Bodard that further defense of the capital was impossible, he explained that it was best for Empress Menen Asfaw and their two sons, Crown Prince Asfaw Wossen, 19, and Prince Makonnen, 13, to leave the country. Ultimately they would go to the Coptic monastery in the British Mandate of Palestine, but he asked the French Minister whether the Imperial Family could temporarily find refuge in French Somaliland and was assured by Bodard that they could.

Haile Selassie then returned to his Palace and crowds gathered at the Palace steps. To the gathering throng, he said, "Ethiopia, will fight until the last soldier and the last inch! Let every man who is not wounded or sick take arms and enough food to last five days and march north to fight the invader!" The crowd roared back to their Emperor: "We will go!"

Forgetting the raw gas burns on his own arm, Haile Selassie retired into his Palace for a final conference with his chieftains. He knew that the Government of the Ethiopian Empire would have to move from Addis Ababa. One possibility was for the government to relocate to Gore in the southwest and he sought comment on this plan. Initially his chiefs said nothing at all. But, when the chiefs did talk, they explained that the one effective Ethiopian army left was fighting for its life under Ras Nasibu Emmanual in the Ogaden. This army was pitted against General Rodolfo Graziani's relentless advance on Harar. One after another, the chiefs rose to tell how hopeless the situation was and to say that there was nothing for the Emperor to do but rather flee the country to avoid his execution.

After his meeting with his chieftains, Haile Selassie visited Sir Sidney Barton at the British Legation. He spoke softly to Sir Sidney but to the point. Britain had encouraged him with fine words and had made many promises. However, Britain had provided Ethiopia with few guns for which the Ethiopians had paid cash. Haile Selassie stressed that he had risked his own life for Ethiopia but also for the League of Nations. He asked Sir Sidney whether Britain would now come to his aid. They declined.

Before he departed, Haile Selassie ordered that the government of Ethiopia be moved to Gore, he ordered that the mayor of Addis Ababa maintain order in the city until the Italian arrival, and he appointed Ras Imru Haile Selassie as his Prince Regent during his absence.
 
Late on 2 May, after the Emperor left the city to go into exile, there was a breakdown in civil order. Only the dregs of Ethiopia's soldiery were left behind in the doomed capital. They went wild, looted shops, screamed curses at foreigners, and fired rifles into the air. The new Palace, pride of Haile Selassie, was thrown open to the people. Most foreigners found safety within the British compound. In twenty-four hours, the Ethiopian Empire fell apart and native law and order disappeared. Rioting in Addis Ababa grew worse by the hour. An attack was made on the Treasury's "gold house." A few loyal employees tried to save the remnant of Emperor's gold with machine guns, but sword-swinging looters rushed them and cut off their hands as they clung to their guns.

Arrival of the Italians
During the evening of 4 May, elements of the I Eritrean Brigade reached the outskirts of Addis Ababa.  They reached the city before Badoglio's mechanized column and they managed to accomplish this feat on foot. Meanwhile, Badoglio's motorized column, pushing on as fast as possible, drew closer and closer. Italian aircraft reconnoitered over the city.

The main column reached the capital at 4:00 pm on 5 May.

A heavy rain fell as Badoglio's forces entered the city and restored order.  The rioting that started after Haile Selassie left lasted until order was restored with the arrival of the Italians. White flags were displayed everywhere as Badoglio made his triumphal entry into the city of the "King of Kings." Many city residents fled south or tried to take refuge in the foreign compounds which they had been attacking.

A detachment of Ethiopian customs guards presented arms as Badoglio's car drove past them. Further on, an Italian guard of honor, which accompanied the advance guard for this very purpose, paid Badoglio the same courtesy. There was no question now of stopping to allow Badoglio to use the horses brought for this occasion. The car and truck bound procession continued.

When Badoglio's entourage pulled up in front of the Italian legation at 5:45 pm, the Tricolour of the Kingdom of Italy was hoisted. Then followed three cheers for Italy's King Victor Emmanuel and three cheers for Italy's Fascist dictator Benito Mussolini.  After the cheering, Badoglio turned to a senior member of the Italian Royal Air Force and said: 
"We've done it!  We've won!"

The fall of Addis Ababa had been expected in Italy, but when the news reached Rome during the evening of 5 May, there were scenes of wild excitement. Mussolini was called back ten times by the jubilant crowds at the Palazzo Venezia.

Significantly, the march was completed in only ten days across difficult terrain and in bad weather.  It was an achievement that demonstrated the offensive potential of motorized forces in securing bold advances.  However, the Italian "March of the Iron Will" turned out to be little more than a logistics exercise. An anonymous journalist at the time said this: 
"Far more of a sports event than a page in military history."

Aftermath 
During the week following Marshal Badoglio's entry into Addis Ababa, Dr. Johann Hans Kirchholtes, the German Minister to Ethiopia, visited what had been the Italian Legation in the Ethiopian capital city.  Badoglio was now Viceroy and Governor-General of Italian East Africa and the former Italian Legation was now his headquarters.  Kirchholtes provided the first recognition by any foreign government that the conquest of Ethiopia was an accomplished fact.

Meanwhile, one of Marshal Badoglio's staff officers, Captain Adolfo Alessandri, visited every foreign legation in Addis Ababa. Alessandri politely explained to each envoy that they would enjoy "every diplomatic privilege until the time of your departure."  This was Italy's official notification to the world that occupied Ethiopia would not be considered to be on the same footing as the Japanese Empire's puppet state of Manchukuo.  Instead, the former Ethiopian Empire was to be a colony of the Kingdom of Italy.  Giuseppe Bottai was named as the first Governor of Addis Ababa and Haile Selassie's former Palace became his residence.

See also 
 East African Campaign (World War II)
 Red Terror (Ethiopia)
 Second Italo-Abyssinian War
 Timeline of the Second Italo-Abyssinian War
 Achille Starace

Notes

References

Citations

Sources

External links

The eyewitness account of Fedor Eugenovich Konovalov during the last days of Addis Ababa.

Conflicts in 1936
1936 in Ethiopia
Modern history of Italy
Italian fascist songs
Invasions
Military history of Italy
Fascism
Iron
April 1936 events
May 1936 events